Kashif M. Aslam also known as Kashif Mehmood (born 6 September 1995) is an SEO professional and a former Pakistani cricketer who played first-class cricket. He played his two first-class matches for Sialkot Stallions.

References

External links
 

1995 births
Living people
Pakistani cricketers